Ellen Anderson (born November 25, 1959) is a Minnesota politician, and an advisor to former Minnesota Governor Mark Dayton.

Anderson is a former member of the Minnesota Senate who represented District 66, which includes the northern portion of the city of Saint Paul, as well as the entire city of Falcon Heights in Ramsey County, which is in the Twin Cities metropolitan area. A Democrat, she was first elected in 1992, and was re-elected in 1996, 2000, 2002, 2006 and 2010.

Anderson was a member of the Senate's Energy, Utilities and Telecommunications, Finance, Higher Education, and Local Government and Elections committees.  In December 2008, she was appointed by Senate Majority Leader Larry Pogemiller to the Minnesota Lessard Outdoor Heritage Council.

On March 9, 2011, Dayton announced her appointment as chair of the Minnesota Public Utilities Commission. She resigned her Senate seat effective March 20, 2011. A special election was held on April 12, 2011, to fill the vacancy. Anderson was ousted as PUC chair on January 30, 2012, when the Republican-controlled Minnesota Senate voted not to confirm her appointment. Dayton subsequently appointed her to a position as a staff advisor on energy issues.

In 1995, Anderson married Andy Dawkins, who served as a state representative from Saint Paul from 1987 to 2003. They divorced in 2018.

References

External links

Senator Anderson Web Page
 Senator Ellen Anderson Campaign Web Site
Minnesota Public Radio - Votetracker: Ellen Anderson Voting Record
Project Vote Smart - Senator Ellen Anderson Profile
Follow the Money - Ellen Anderson Campaign Contributions

 2008
 2006 2004 2002 2000 1996

Democratic Party Minnesota state senators
Minnesota lawyers
University of Minnesota Law School alumni
Carleton College alumni
1959 births
Living people
Politicians from Saint Paul, Minnesota
Women state legislators in Minnesota
21st-century American politicians
21st-century American women politicians